Jonata Felipe Machado (born 7 June 1999) is a Brazilian footballer who plays as a midfielder in Club Jorge Wilstermann.

He came through the youth ranks at the Botafogo-SP, featuring in the 2018 Copa São Paulo de Futebol Júnior with a goal against Cruzeiro Futebol Clube (Distrito Federal). He made his senior national league debut in the first match of the 2019 season, against Vitória.

References

External links
 

Living people
1999 births
Brazilian footballers
Association football midfielders
Botafogo Futebol Clube (SP) players
FC Lokomotiv 1929 Sofia players
Campeonato Brasileiro Série B players